Shenzi may refer to:

 Shen Buhai, Chinese philosopher, or his lost work 
 Shen Dao, Chinese philosopher, or his lost work 
 Shenzi (The Lion King), a hyena character from Disney's The Lion King